Marcos Bonifacio da Rocha (born 7 March 1976) is a Brazilian football player. He plays for Tonan Maebashi.

Club statistics

References

External links

1976 births
Living people
Brazilian footballers
Brazilian expatriate footballers
Expatriate footballers in Japan
J2 League players
Japan Football League (1992–1998) players
Montedio Yamagata players
Albirex Niigata players
Kawasaki Frontale players
Mito HollyHock players
Association football midfielders